Jean Antoine Le Bègue de Germiny (Nancy, 1 December 1727 — Landerneau, 13 May 1808) was a French Navy officer. He served in the War of American Independence.

Biography 
Le Bègue was born to Léopold Le Bègue de Germiny (1700-1758), a State council to Leopold, Duke of Lorraine. He later married Marie Josèphe de Parceveaux, daughter of Captain Parceveaux. He joined the Navy as a Garde-Marine on 1 April 1748. 

Le Bègue was promoted to Lieutenant on 1 January 1761. 
Le Bègue  was promoted to Captain on 4 April 1777. In 1779, he proposed plans to raid British factories on the coast of Senegal.

He was given command of the 74-gun Magnanime, which he captained during the Battle of the Chesapeake on 5 September 1781.  He took part in the Battle of the Saintes on 12 April 1782, where he was wounded.

Le Bègue  was promoted to Brigadier in 1782,  and to Chef d'Escadre in 1786.

Le Bègue was a member of the Académie de Marine, and a Knight in the Order of Saint Louis.

Sources and references 
 Notes

Citations

Bibliography
 
 
 

 

French Navy officers
French military personnel of the American Revolutionary War